Laspeyres is a surname. Notable people with the surname include:

Étienne Laspeyres (1834–1913), German economist
Jakob Heinrich Laspeyres (1769–1809), German entomologist